Tha Kham is a town in southern Thailand. As of 2006 it covered an area of 14.10 km² and had a population of 20,349. It covers parts of the subdistrict (tambon) Tha Kham of Phunphin District, Surat Thani Province. It is on the shores of the Tapi River. The Surat Thani Railway Station is in town center.

History
The town dates back to the sanitary district (sukhaphiban), Tha Kham, which was created on 17 September 1955. It was upgraded to a township (thesaban tambon) on 14 April 1986, and further upgraded to a town (thesaban mueang) on 20 December 2000.

Symbols
The seal of the town shows the Tapi River railway bridge.

References

External links
http://www.takhamcity.go.th Website of town

Populated places in Surat Thani province